Mamadu Bobó Djalo  (born 9 February 1963), sometimes known as just Bobó, is a Bissau-Guinean former professional football player and manager.

Between 2008 and 2011, Djalo worked as a scout for Chelsea.

Personal life
Djalo is the father of the Bissau-Guinean footballer Matchoi Djaló.

Honours
Porto
 Supertaça Cândido de Oliveira: 1981, 1983
 Taça de Portugal: 1983–84

Estrela da Amadora
 Taça de Portugal: 1989–90

Boavista
 Taça de Portugal: 1991–92, 1996–97
 Supertaça Cândido de Oliveira: 1992

References

External links 
 
 
 

1963 births
Living people
People from Cacheu Region
Bissau-Guinean footballers
Guinea-Bissau international footballers
Portuguese footballers
Portugal under-21 international footballers
Bissau-Guinean emigrants to Portugal
Association football midfielders
Primeira Liga players
FC Porto players
Segunda Divisão players
Varzim S.C. players
Vitória S.C. players
C.S. Marítimo players
C.F. Estrela da Amadora players
Boavista F.C. players
Bissau-Guinean expatriate footballers
Expatriate footballers in Portugal